A medicine show is a traveling act that uses entertainment to sell patent medicines.

Other uses of the term include:

Comedy
"The Medicine Show", a 1933 Krazy Kat cartoon
"The Pink Medicine Show", a 1978 sketch comedy program featuring Rob Buckman

Fiction
InterGalactic Medicine Show, an online science fiction magazine
Orson Scott Card's InterGalactic Medicine Show , an anthology of material originally published in it
Medicine Show, a 1994 novel by Jody Lynn Nye

Drama
"Medicine Show", a 1952 episode of The Adventures of Wild Bill Hickok
"Medicine Show", a 1958 episode of Union Pacific
"The Great American Medicine Show", a 1993 episode of Dr. Quinn, Medicine Woman

Music
Medicine Show, a 1984 album by The Dream Syndicate
The Medicine Show, a 2019 album by Melissa Etheridge
Madlib Medicine Show, a series of albums by Madlib
Medicine Show Man, a 1964 album by Pink Anderson
"Medicine Show", a 1985 song by Big Audio Dynamite
"The W.S. Walcott Medicine Show, a 1970 song by Robbie Robertson
"The Incredible Medicine Show", a song by Moxy Früvous from their 1997 album You Will Go to the Moon
Old Crow Medicine Show, a string band
Old Crow Medicine Show (album), their 2004 album
Dr. West's Medicine Show and Junk Band, a psychedelic rock band
Dr. Hook & the Medicine Show, a rock band
MV & EE, a neo-psychedelic band who also recorded under the name "MV & EE Medicine Show"